Zagheh may refer to:

Hamadan Province
Zagheh, Bahar, a village in Bahar County, Hamadan Province, Iran

Kermanshah Province
Zagheh-ye Bozorg-e Qaleh-ye Ranjbar, a village in Dalahu County
Zagheh-ye Ali Karam, a village in Gilan-e Gharb County

Kurdistan Province
Zagheh, Kurdistan, a village in Dehgolan County
Zagheh-ye Olya, a village in Divandarreh County
Zagheh-ye Sofla, a village in Divandarreh County

Lorestan Province
Zagheh, a city in Khorramabad County
Zagheh, Dorud, a city in Dorud County
Zagheh District, an administrative subdivision of Khorramabad County

Markazi Province
Zagheh-ye Akbarabad, a village in Shazand County

Qazvin Province
Zagheh, Qazvin, a village in Abyek County

West Azerbaijan Province
Zagheh, Khoy, a village in Khoy County
Zagheh, Baruq, a village in Baruq County

Zanjan Province
Zagheh, Zanjan, a village in Khodabandeh County